Hang Ups is a British television sitcom co-written by and starring Stephen Mangan. It was first broadcast on 8 August 2018 on Channel 4. The series is an adaptation of the American series Web Therapy. Mangan portrays Dr Richard Pitt, a troubled therapist who decides to start quick-fire therapy sessions through a webcam. The show features a celebrity ensemble cast as Richard's patients.

Cast

Pitt's therapy patients are portrayed by a large ensemble cast, including Harry Lloyd, Sarah Hadland, Lolly Adefope, Monica Dolan, David Bradley, Jo Joyner, David Tennant and Daisy Haggard.

Episodes

Reception
The first episode of Hang Ups received a positive response from critics. The Telegraph awarded the premiere five stars, calling it a "wonderfully ribald treat", while The Guardian praised it for managing "the rarest of TV feats: a UK adaptation that's every bit as good as the US original". The Daily Express complimented the show for "successfully [using] comedy to shine light on the importance of mental health without crossing a line".

References

External links

2018 British television series debuts
2018 British television series endings
2010s British sitcoms
British television series based on American television series
Channel 4 sitcoms
English-language television shows
Television series by Fremantle (company)
Television series about dysfunctional families